During the first Samoan Civil War from 1888 to 1894 German warships shelled and destroyed a large amount of villages loyal to Mata'afa Iosefo.  The Samoans were outraged leading to the First Battle of Vailele which occurred on 18 December 1888 at the German plantation of Vailele. around 150 German marines were sent to vailele to try disarm the Samoan Mata'afan forces. They walked right into an ambush set up by an unknown number of Samoan mata afan warriors. 55 German marine were slaughtered by forces loyal to Mata'afa Iosefo. many of the Germans who were killed in Vailele were later found with their heads missing from their bodies.On the same day the Samoans also attacked the Germen plantations at Fagali'i killing 57 German marines. The Samoans also began burning and destroying the German property on the plantations in retaliation of the destroyed villages. These clashes with the Samoans rather upset all the previous European assumptions about the Samoan power of resistance. Confused German officers were surprised that the Samoans attacked German troops, they were also shocked at the ruthlessness and savagery the Samoans had shown in battle.

A memorial for the Germans killed at the battles was erected in a ceremony presided over by the commander of the unprotected cruiser .

See also 
 Second Battle of Vailele

Notes

References

 
 Hempestall, Peter L.; Mochida, Paula Tanaka (2005) The Lost Man: Wilhelm Solf in German History. Otto Harrassowitz Verlag. 

First Samoan Civil War
1888 in Samoa
Tuamasaga
German Samoa
Battles involving Germany
Ambushes